Anita Marie Barnard (born 1960) is an American poet and visual artist working in glass, concrete, paint, mosaic, and collage.

Over twenty-five of Barnard's poems have won recognition by judges and editors of poetry journals and literary magazines, most recently Borderlands: Texas Poetry Review and New Millennium Writings 2010. She has also edited several poetry anthologies.

Barnard's visual art has been exhibited at juried shows in New York, Illinois, Texas, Virginia, Germany, and New Zealand.

Poetry – awards and recognition 
 (year?) Night Roses published "poem?" in the issue?
 (year?) The Raven published "four poems?" in the issue? (featured author) and "two poems?" in the issue? (contest winner)
 (year?) Pinehurst Review? Journal?
 (year?) Hawaiʻi Review
 (year) Rats...? two poems
 (year?) Tin Wreath
 (1990) Dreams & Nightmares published "Baptism" in issue no. 32.
 (1991) Midnight Zoo published "Hunter's Moon" and "The Hunt" in the January 1991 issue.
 (1991) Midnight Zoo published "To Ease the Terrors" and "Mistrust" in the March/April 1991 issue.
 (1991) Dreams & Nightmares published "False Thaw" in issue no. 34.
 (1995) The Lucid Stone published "Moving Toward Alexandria" in issue no. 2, Summer 1995.
 (2007) The Comstock Review awarded "Unwinding" Finalist distinction in their annual poetry contest for The Muriel Craft Bailey Memorial Award and published it in issue no. 21.2, Fall/Winter 2007.
 (2007) Borderlands: Texas Poetry Review published "My Daughter Talks to the Ants (I Have Just Tried to Poison)" in the Spring/Summer 2007 issue.
 (2007) Illya's Honey published "Rooting" and "Red" in issue no. 13, Spring/Summer 2007, and nominated "Red" for the 2008 Pushcart Prize.
 (2007) Dos Gatos Press published "Marble Falls" in Texas Poetry Calendar 2008.
 (2008) Les Bonnes Fees published "Glass" in the November 2008 issue.
 (2009) New Millennium Writings awarded "Building With Straw" Honorable Mention distinction and published it in issue no. 19.
 (2008) The Blanton Poetry Project placed a copy of "Callisto Exposed" in the Blanton Museum of Art, University of Texas at Austin, paired with the painting Diana and Callisto by Jan Brueghel the Elder and Hendrick van Balen, and Borderlands: Texas Poetry Review published it in the Spring/Summer 2009 special issue devoted to ekphrastic poetry.
 (2014) Cosmic Teapot/Chris Johnson published "Alchemy" in the book A Better Life: 100 Atheists Speak Out on Joy & Meaning in a World Without God.

Poetry – publications 
 (1995) Blood Offerings, a blood themed anthology of poetry co-edited and published by Barnard and Michelle Rhea. Barnard and Rhea were invited by the Dallas Poets Community to read from Blood Offerings at the McKinney Avenue Contemporary gallery in Dallas, Texas.
 (1997) Other Testaments: A Poetry Anthology (Volume 1: The Old Testament and Volume 2: The New Testament), an anthology of Biblical revisionist poetry co-edited and published by Rhea and Barnard.
 (2001) Sense of Touch: A Poetry Anthology, an anthology of erotic poetry co-edited and published by Barnard and Stephen Vanek.
 (2003) Above Us Only Sky: Atheist Poetry, an anthology co-edited and published by Rhea and Barnard.
 (2008) Above Us Only Sky: Atheist Poetry: Volume Two, an anthology co-edited and published by Rhea and Barnard. Premiere readings took place in November, 2008 at the Center for Inquiry—Los Angeles and in January, 2009 at the Humanist Society of Santa Barbara.
 (2009) The Venomed Kiss: Poems Of Childhood Emotional & Psychological Abuse, an anthology co-edited and published by Barnard and Rhea.
 (2013) On the Dark Path: An Anthology of Fairy Tale Poetry, an anthology edited and published by Barnard.

Visual art – awards and recognition 
 (2005) Life After The Tale, collage, was accepted by Smithtown Township Arts Council (STAC) for a juried exhibition, Women, Words and Images, at the Mills Pond House Gallery, St. James, New York. Reviews of the exhibition appeared in The New York Times and Newsday.
 Firehouse Gallery – Functional Art
 Firehouse Gallery – eVeryDAY a woman: Art BY, FOR, and ABOUT WOMEN
 Human Artefakts – HUMAN ÄŔTε⃞FAKŤS – Chicago area; Virginia; Bremen, Germany; 4 galleries in New Zealand

References

External links 
 Anita Barnard on Artnet 
 Biographical page at Incarnate Muse

1960 births
Living people
20th-century American women artists
20th-century American poets
21st-century American women artists
21st-century American poets